Benjamin Franklin Adams (October 13, 1936 – May 21, 2005) was an American Negro league pitcher in the 1950s and 1960s.

A native of Norfolk, Virginia, Adams broke into the Negro leagues in 1952 with the Indianapolis Clowns. He played for a number of teams throughout the following years, including the Kansas City Monarchs. Adams retired in 1969, ending his career with 11 years with the Monarchs. He died in Grand Rapids, Michigan in 2005 at age 68.

References

External links
 Ben Adams at Negro Leagues Baseball Museum

1936 births
2005 deaths
Sportspeople from Norfolk, Virginia
Indianapolis Clowns players
Kansas City Monarchs players
Memphis Red Sox players
20th-century African-American sportspeople
Baseball pitchers
21st-century African-American people